Ballow may refer to:

Persons
 Henry Ballow (1707–1782), English lawyer
 David Keith Ballow (1804–1850), Australian government medical officer

Buildings
 Ballow Chambers, heritage-listed office building, Brisbane, Queensland, Australia